Shidler College of Business at the University of Hawaiʻi at Mānoa is located in the U.S. state of Hawaii and is the state's only public business school with graduate, executive and PhD level programs. Established in 1949, the Shidler College of Business is named after The Shidler Group's Jay H. Shidler, founder and managing partner of The Shidler Group, a Honolulu-based company focused on commercial real estate and credit-related investments. In 2014, Mr. Shidler increased his initial gift of $25 million to $100 million, making it the largest donation at the University of Hawaii from a private donor.

The Shidler College of Business is accredited by the Association to Advance Collegiate Schools of Business (AACSB), and offers a Bachelor of Business Administration (BBA), a Master of Business Administration (MBA) (Full-time and Part-Time), a Master of Accounting, a Master of Human Resource Management, an Executive Master of Business Administration (EMBA), and a Doctor of Philosophy in Business Administration (PhD).  Through partnerships with international universities, Shidler also offers a Global Master of Business Administration (MBA) with tracks in China, Japan and Vietnam, a Vietnam Executive Master of Business Administration (VEMBA). Shidler also offers a Graduate Certificate in Entrepreneurship.

For 2015, U.S. News & World Report ranked Shidler amongst the nation's top business schools. Shidler's international business program was ranked 18th best.

History
Hawaii experienced rapid social and economic growth during the post-World War II period. To meet the challenges presented by this growth, the Hawai‘i state government alongside many state businesses encouraged the University of Hawai‘i to establish a College of Business to develop the state's future business leaders. In 1949, the University of Hawai‘i at Manoa College of Business Administration opened its doors to a small group of business students in the historic Hawaii Hall building. While the College's initial curriculum provided a strong foundation to develop business leaders, its scope was limited to accounting, economics, and industrial relations.

With Hawaii's sustained growth, the College also grew. In the early 1960s, the College recruited top business professors to help strengthen the existing program. Additional changes included strengthening the College in the area of liberal arts, requiring each student to minor in economics, and offering a general business program in fields such as management, finance, personnel, and statistics.

In 1967, the College received national accreditation from Association to Advance Collegiate Schools of Business (AACSB), whereby placing it amongst the nation's best business schools.

With 1,300 students enrolled in the mid-60's, it became clear that the College was outgrowing its existing space at Hawai‘i Hall. In 1969, the United States Department of Health, Education and Welfare provided a grant while spurred the construction of a new building. In the fall of 1971, the College moved into its new facility. In the next few years, the College continued to grow at an alarming rate almost doubling its size by the late 1970s.

In the mid-'70s to the early '90s, the College matured and gained worldwide recognition for its international business focus. Faculty members with expertise in Asian business were heavily recruited; foreign and United States mainland students with an interest in international studies were applying in greater numbers and exchange opportunities with international universities were created.

In 2006, the University of Hawaii Board of Regents voted to accept a $25 million donation from alumnus and founder of The Shidler Group, Jay H. Shidler, naming the College after him as the Shidler College of Business. In 2014, Jay H. Shidler extended his commitment to the College to $100 million, making it the largest donation to the University of Hawaii from a private donor. Mr. Shidler’s unique gift of ownership interests (leased-fees) in various land parcels across the U.S., as well as cash gifts, in-kind gifts and marketable securities, will generate income in perpetuity to meet the College’s long-term financial needs.

Academics

Undergraduate Degrees

Bachelor of Business Administration
Shidler offers a Bachelor of Business Administration (BBA) with majors available in:
Accounting
Entrepreneurship
Finance
Human Resource Management
International Business
Management
Management Information Systems
Marketing

The Shidler College also offers a Freshman Direct Admit Program (DAP) for high achieving high school seniors who plan to major in business.

Graduate Degrees
Shidler offers the following graduate degrees:

Master of Business Administration
Shidler offers the following Master of Business Administration (MBA) programs:
Global MBA
Global MBA with China Track
Global MBA with Japan Track
Part-time MBA
Executive MBA
Distance Learning Executive MBA
Vietnam Executive MBA

Master of Accounting
Shidler offers a Master of Accounting.

Master of Human Resource Management
Shidler offers a Master of Human Resource Management.

Doctor of Philosophy in Business Administration
Shidler offers a Doctor of Philosophy in Business Administration.

Graduate certificates
Shidler offers the following Graduate Certificates:
Graduate Certificate in Entrepreneurship

Institutes
The Pacific-Asian Center for Entrepreneurship (PACE)
Pacific-Asian Management Institute (PAMI)
Pacific Research Institute for Information Systems and Management (PRIISM)

Research centers
Center for International Business Education and Research (CIBER)
Pacific Asian Consortium for International Business Education and Research (PACIBER)
 Hawaii International Conference on System Sciences] (HICSS)
Family Business Center of Hawaii

References

External links

1949 establishments in Hawaii
Business schools in Hawaii
University of Hawaiʻi
Educational institutions established in 1949
Buildings and structures in Honolulu
Education in Honolulu